Agum Gumelar (born in Tasikmalaya, West Java, December 17, 1945) is a politician and former general of the Indonesian National Armed Forces. He is a former minister having held several positions, a former chairman of Indonesian Football Association and National Sports Committee of Indonesia. He is an alumnus of the National Military Academy in Magelang, Central Java and Medical Faculty of Padjadjaran University in Bandung, West Java. In 1998, he received a master's degree from American World University, an organization forbidden to operate in 2005 because of its diploma mill action.

Family
Agum is married to Linda Amaliasari and has 2 children, Haris Khaseli Gumelar and Ami Dianti Gumelar.

Military career
Agum entered the Indonesian Military Academy in Magelang, Central Java in 1969. In 1973, he was appointed as staff in the Operational Command for the Restoration of Security and Order.
In late 1987, Agum was promoted to Vice Intelligence Assistance of Special Force Command until 1990. In 1991, he was transferred to Vice Intelligence of Jakarta military area command. In 1992 Agum was promoted to Chief of Danrem 042/Garuda Hitam at Lampung.
In 1993, he was promoted as Director A of the Strategic Intelligence Board of Indonesian National Armed Forces and also promoted to Chief of Special Force Command.  In 1994, he was promoted to the position of Chief of Staff of the Bukit Barisan Military Area Command until 1996 when he was again transferred and promoted as Chief of the Wirabuana Military Area Command until 1998.
By 1998 he was promoted as Governor of National Resilience Institute, until 1999.

Politic career

Wahid Presidency
When Abdurrahman Wahid became president in 1999, Agum was appointed as Minister of Transportation.  In July 2001 he was moved to the position of Minister of Defense and Coordinating Minister of Politics, Social and Security during the fourth Wahid government cabinet reshuffle.

Megawati Presidency
When Wahid was impeached by the People's Consultative Assembly and Megawati Sukarnoputri was appointed as president, Agum was appointed as Minister of Transport, a position he held in the Mutual Assistance Cabinet until 2004.

Widodo Presidency
In January 2018, Agum was appointed as a member of the Presidential Advisory Council in a minor reshuffle, replacing Hasyim Muzadi who died in 2017.

2004 Indonesian Presidential Election
During the first direct presidential elections in Indonesia in 2004, Agum was selected as a vice presidential candidate. He joined the incumbent vice president Hamzah Haz as a running mate. The Hamzah – Agum team was supported by the United Development Party.
In the first round of the election (July 5, 2004), the Hamzah – Agum team received relatively low support (only 3.5 million votes).  These results put the duo into fifth place on in the 2004 Indonesian presidential elections behind SBY – Jusuf Kalla, Megawati Sukarnoputri – Hasyim Muzadi, Wiranto – Solahuddin Wahid and Amien Rais – Siswono Yudohusodo. The Hamzah – Agum team was therefore eliminated and was not eligible to take place in second round of the election held several months later.

2008 West Java Gubernatorial Election
In 2008 the West Java province held the first direct gubernatorial election.  Agum took part in the competition, supported by a coalition of Indonesian Democratic Party - Struggle and United Development Party, with his running mate, the incumbent vice governor Nu'man Abdul Hakim.
Agum was unsuccessful with the Agum – Nu'man duo taking second place behind Ahmad Heryawan – Yusuf Macan Effendie team from coalition of the Prosperous Justice Party and National Mandate Party.

Notes

References
 Agum Gumelar
 Profil Agum Gumelar
Complete profile of Agum Gumelar

External links
  PSSI

1945 births
Living people
Indonesian Muslims
People from Tasikmalaya
Indonesian National Military Academy alumni
Government ministers of Indonesia
Presidents of the Football Association of Indonesia
Football Association of Indonesia officials
Sundanese people
Defense ministers of Indonesia
Indonesian generals
Transport ministers of Indonesia